I'll Be Lightning is the 2007 debut album by New Zealand artist Liam Finn. The album was recorded at his father Neil's Roundhead Studios in Auckland, New Zealand. The album is notable in that Liam plays most of the instruments himself. The album was made #42 in Q's 50 Best Albums of the Year 2008.

Vinyl/Digital Track listing 
All songs were written by Liam Finn, except where noted
 "Turn Up the Birds"
 "Better to Be"
 "Second Chance"
 "Gather to the Chapel"
 "Lead Balloon"
 "Fire in Your Belly" (Finn, Chris Garland)
 "Music Moves My Feet"
 "This Place Is Killing Me"
 "I'd Rather Waste You Than the Money on My Phone" (Finn, Matt Eccles)
 "Lullaby"
 "I'll Be Lightning" (Finn, Connan Hosford)
 "Remember When"
 "Come Home Sam"
 "I Found Noise at ATP"
 "I Will Explode" (Finn, Eccles)
 "Energy Spent"
 "Wise Man"
 "Wide Awake on the Voyage Home"
 "Shadow of Your Man"

CD Track Listing 
All songs were written by Liam Finn, except where noted
 "Better to Be" – 3:46
 "Second Chance" – 4:52
 "Gather to the Chapel" – 3:20
 "Lead Balloon" – 4:15
 "Fire in Your Belly" (Finn, Chris Garland) – 3:15
 "Lullaby" – 2:02
 "Energy Spent" – 4:08
 "Music Moves My Feet" – 2:24
 "Remember When" – 3:04
 "Wise Man" – 5:17
 "This Place Is Killing Me" – 4:06
 "I'll Be Lightning" (Finn, Connan Hosford) – 4:14
 "Wide Awake on the Voyage Home" – 5:37
 "Shadow of Your Man" – 2:57

Personnel 
 Liam Finn - vocals, all instruments except noted
 Matt Eccles - drums on Lead Balloon, I'll Be Lightning, Remember When, I Will Explode, Wise Man; guitar and bass on I'd Rather Waste You Than The Money On My Phone
 Neil Finn - bass on I'll Be Lightning
 Connan Hosford - autoharp and vocals on I'll Be Lightning

Production
 Produced by Liam Finn
 Recorded at Roundhead Studios
 Engineered by Liam Finn, except Remember When and Wise Man (Neil Baldock)

References

Liam Finn albums
2007 debut albums
Liberation Records albums
Yep Roc Records albums
Albums recorded at Roundhead Studios